The 1989–90 FIS Cross-Country World Cup was the 9th official World Cup season in cross-country skiing for men and women. The World Cup started in Soldier Hollow, United States, on 9 December 1989 and finished in Vang, Norway, on 17 March 1990. Vegard Ulvang of Norway won the overall men's cup, and Larisa Lazutina of the Soviet Union won the overall women's cup.

Calendar

Men

Women

Men's team

Women's team

Men's overall standings

Women's overall standings

Achievements
First World Cup career victory

Men
  Bjørn Dæhlie, 22, in his 2nd season – the WC 1 (15 km C) in Salt Lake City; also first podium
  Christer Majbäck, 25, in his 6th season – the WC 2 (15 km F) in Calgary; first podium was 1984–85 WC 7 (15 km) in Syktyvkar 
  Jochen Behle, 29, in his 9th season – the WC 3 (15 km F) in Calgary; first podium was 1981–82 WC 9 (15 km) in Štrbské Pleso 
  Terje Langli, 25, in his 4th season – the WC 10 (30 km C) in Örnsköldsvik; also first podium

Women
  Stefania Belmondo, 20, in her 2nd season – the WC 2 (15 km F) in Salt Lake City; also first podium
  Larisa Lazutina, 24, in her 6th season – the WC 3 (15 km C) in Thunder Bay; first podium was 1986–87 WC 7 (20 km F) in Oberstdorf
  Trude Dybendahl, 24, in her 5th season – the WC 4 (30 km F) in Moscow; first podium was 1988–89 WC 4 (15 km C) in Kavgolovo
  Manuela Di Centa, 27, in her 6th season – the WC 5 (15 km F) in Pontresina; first podium was 1988–89 WC 5 (10 km C) in Klingenthal
  Svetlana Nageykina, 25, in her 5th season – the WC 7 (10 km C) in Bohinj; first podium was 1987–88 WC 10 (10 km F) in Rovaniemi

Victories in this World Cup (all-time number of victories as of 1989–90 season in parentheses)

Men
 , 3 (29) first places
 , 3 (3) first places
 , 1 (4) first place
 , 1 (3) first place
 , 1 (1) first place
 , 1 (1) first place
 , 1 (1) first place

Women
 , 3 (3) first places
 , 2 (7) first places
 , 2 (2) first places
 , 1 (2) first place
 , 1 (1) first place
 , 1 (1) first place
 , 1 (1) first place

References

FIS Cross-Country World Cup seasons
World Cup 1989-90
World Cup 1989-90